Abt Sportsline is a motor racing and auto tuning company based in Kempten im Allgäu, Germany. ABT mainly deals with Audi and the related primary Volkswagen Group brands—Volkswagen, Škoda, and SEAT—modifying them by using sports-type suspensions, engine power upgrades, lightweight wheels, aerodynamic components and more. It has been active in DTM for more than a decade. After the death of their father Johann in 2003, the company with 170 employees in their headquarters in Kempten was run by the brothers Hans-Jürgen Abt (born 1962, Managing Director) and Christian Abt. Since 2011, Hans-Jürgen Abt has run the company.

From 2014 to 2021, they ran a team under the Audi Sport banner in the FIA Formula E World Championship for drivers Lucas di Grassi, Daniel Abt and René Rast. At the 2014 Beijing ePrix, di Grassi became the first driver to win an open-wheel motorsport race in an all-electric car. Ultimately, the team finished third in the first teams' championship. After leaving the championship in 2022, they returned without the Audi partnership for the 2022–23 season.

History
Johann Abt (20 December 1935 – 11 October 2003), who continued a horseshoeing tradition of his family with motor cars, was a motorcycling and hillclimbing racer for the Abarth factory team until 1970. He is the father of Hans-Jürgen Abt and Christian Abt. He later entered cars with his own team, winning the "Trophée de l'Avenir" and many other series. Johann Abt's father founded the first Abt company in 1896.

In 1991 Abt Sportsline GmbH was founded following "Auto-Abt". In October 2002 an extension building was opened offering about  extra of work space. Since November 2013 there is a third building giving the Abt Motorsports Department a new home.

In summer of 2011 Abt celebrated their 115th anniversary since the first formation of the company in 1896. About 170 employees are working in the company's headquarters in Kempten, Germany, the products are sold in more than 50 countries worldwide. Since 2011 the Abt Lifestyle GmbH, run by Daniel Abt, organizes events for private or business customers.

Motorsport

After participating in a motorcycle race the company's founder Johann Abt started his racing career and the motorsports career of the company in general. Today Abt Sportsline is one of the most successful motorsports teams and has won several championships in the most important German racing series, like the Super Touring Car Cup (1999), the Deutsche Tourenwagen Masters (DTM; titles in 2002, 2004, 2007, 2008 and 2009) and the ADAC GT Masters (titles in 2009 and 2010). Since 2004, Abt Sportsline is one of the official factory teams of Audi under the name of Audi Sport Team Abt Sportsline.

The most successful year in motorsports for Abt Sportsline was 2009, receiving honors in three racing series at once: the DTM with Timo Scheider, the ADAC GT Masters with Christian Abt and the ADAC Formel Masters with Daniel Abt. In 2013, Daniel Abt was active in the GP2 Series and – beginning in September 2014 – he joined Lucas di Grassi as the second driver in the FIA Formula E Championship, where Abt participated.

The German squad left Formula E after the 2020–21 season. In May 2022, Abt announced they would be returning to Formula E for the 2022–23 season with Cupra as ABT CUPRA Formula E Team after a season away, sourcing powertrains from Mahindra Racing.

Abt partnered with Cupra to enter the electric off-road racing series Extreme E as ABT CUPRA XE in 2021.

Aftermarket
Abt has taken much of their racing knowledge and adapted it for the street, making the company a successful tuner for the full Volkswagen Group line of products.

Abt Sportsline has announced in 2015 that they are going to introduce their new tuning program for the European Volkswagen Passat at the Geneva Motor Show. While hosting the new Passat, their goal is to showcase a more aggressive kit that includes a front lip spoiler, revised side skirts, a tailgate-mounted spoiler, Abt-branded floor mats, 20- or 21-inch alloy wheels with Continental "sport-type" tires, optional mirror caps, sport springs and sports exhaust system, and a body kit that is more aerodynamic than the standard model.

Notable cars
Modified Luxury & Exotics magazine called the AS4-R, "a grocery getter that delivers," and said it, "handles like a toy..."
 TT-R – A supercharged second generation V6 Audi TT.
 R8 GT R – A highly modified version of the Audi R8 V10 turning it into what Abt Sportsline calls a "motorsport champion for the road." The interior features many modifications to make it more like a race car, including racing seats, a fire extinguisher, a 4-point seat belt, a rollover bar, and new steering wheel. Various other modifications make this a high performance road-legal race car.

Racing Results

Formula E

Notes
  – In the inaugural season, all teams were supplied with a spec powertrain by McLaren.
  – Driver was fastest in group qualifying stage and was given one championship point.
 † – Driver did not finish the race, but was classified as he completed over 90% of the race distance.

Other teams supplied by Audi Sport ABT

References

External links

 

Audi
Auto tuning companies
German racecar constructors
German auto racing teams
Auto parts suppliers of Germany
Car manufacturers of Germany
Privately held companies of Germany
Automotive companies established in 1896
Automotive motorsports and performance companies
Deutsche Tourenwagen Masters teams
ADAC GT Masters teams
German Formula 3 teams
Formula E teams
Sports car manufacturers
Red Bull sports teams
1896 establishments in Germany
Formula E Teams' Champions
Super GT teams
Blancpain Endurance Series teams
Audi in motorsport
British Touring Car Championship teams